Jean Teulé (26 February 1953 – 18 October 2022) was a French novelist, cartoonist and screenwriter. He was the partner of actress Miou-Miou.

Teulé’s book Le magasin des suicides (The Suicide Shop), published in 2007, has been turned into a film called The Suicide Shop.  It screened at the Newport Beach Film Festival in Newport Beach, California, on 28 April 2013 and 2 May 2013.

Teulé died from a cardiac arrest on 18 October 2022, at the age of 69.

Works 
Books
 Bloody Mary, plot by Jean Vautrin, Glénat, 1984
 Filles de nuit, Glénat, 1985
 Sita-Java, plot by Gourio, Glénat, 1986
 Gens de France, Casterman, 1988
 Zazou !, Comixland, 1988
 Gens d'ailleurs, Casterman, 1993 (two volume reissue of the one volume Gens de France et d'ailleurs by Ego comme X in 2005)
 Rainbow pour Rimbaud, Éditions Julliard, 1991
 L'Œil de Pâques, Éditions Julliard, 1992
 Ballade pour un père oublié, Éditions Julliard, 1995
 Darling, Éditions Julliard, 1998
 Bord cadre, Éditions Julliard, 1999
 Longues Peines, Éditions Julliard, 2001)
 Les Lois de la gravité, Éditions Julliard, 2003
 Ô Verlaine !, Éditions Julliard, 2004
 Je, François Villon, Éditions Julliard, 2006
 Le magasin des suicides, Éditions Julliard, 2007. Tr. The Suicide Shop London: Gallic (2008).
 Le Montespan, Éditions Julliard, 2008, Pocket 2009. Grand Prix Palatine du roman historique, prix Maison de la Presse 2008. Tr. Monsieur Montespan: London: Gallic (2011).
 Mangez-le si vous voulez, Éditions Julliard, 2009. Tr. Eat Him If You Like London: Gallic (2011).
 Charly 9, Julliard, 2011.
 Fleur de tonnerre, Julliard, 2013.
 Héloïse ouille !, Julliard, 2015.
 Plot of Je voudrais me suicider mais j'ai pas le temps, (drawings by Florence Cestac), éd. Dargaud, 2009, biography of Charlie Schlingo.
 Azincourt par temps de pluie, Mialet-Barrault éditeurs, 2022.

Filmography
 1996 : Rainbow pour Rimbaud, director and writer
 1997 : Romaine, actor
 2005 : Caché, actor
 2007 : Darling, adaptation of his novel

References

External links
French interview with Teulé, about his comics, on the website of "gens de france et d'ailleurs" editor

1953 births
2022 deaths
People from Saint-Lô
20th-century French novelists
21st-century French novelists
French male screenwriters
French screenwriters
French male film actors
French male novelists
French illustrators
French comics artists
20th-century French male writers
21st-century French male writers